is a Japanese football defender who plays for J1 League team Sagan Tosu.

Career 
After graduating from Kagoshima Commercial High School in 2005, Iwashita signed for S-Pulse where he has played since. In 2007 he scored his first goal for S-Pulse in a 2-0 away victory at Albirex Niigata.

He received his first call-up for the senior national team in 2009 by Takeshi Okada but has yet to play a game for Japan.

Career statistics
Updated to end of 2018 season.

 1 includes J. League Championship, Japanese Super Cup and Suruga Bank Championship appearances.

Reserves performance

Honors

Gamba Osaka

J. League Division 1 - 2014
J. League Division 2 - 2013
Emperor's Cup - 2014, 2015
J. League Cup - 2014
Japanese Super Cup - 2015

References

External links
Profile at Avispa Fukuoka

1986 births
Living people
Association football people from Kagoshima Prefecture
Japanese footballers
J1 League players
J2 League players
J3 League players
Shimizu S-Pulse players
Gamba Osaka players
Gamba Osaka U-23 players
Avispa Fukuoka players
Sagan Tosu players
Association football defenders